Jean-Charles Roman d'Amat (Crots, 12 May 1887 – Versailles, 29 March 1976) was a French librarian and historian. He was one of the editors of Dictionnaire de biographie française.

External links
Authority record, BNF website

1887 births
1976 deaths
French librarians
French biographers
People from Hautes-Alpes
French male non-fiction writers
20th-century French male writers